There are various genealogies described in the Bible.

Genesis 

The book of Genesis records the descendants of Adam and Eve. The enumerated genealogy in chapters 4, 5, and 11, reports the lineal male descent to Abraham, including the age at which each patriarch fathered his named son and the number of years he lived thereafter. The genealogy for Cain is given in chapter 4, and the genealogy for Seth is in chapter 5. The genealogy in chapter 10, recording the male descendants of Noah, is known as the Table of Nations.

Family tree of Adam

Table of Nations

Within the book of Genesis, the Table of Nations is an extensive list of descendants of Noah, which appears within the Torah at Genesis 10, representing an ethnology from an Iron Age Levantine perspective and its reflections in the medieval and modern history and genealogy researches.

Family tree of Abraham

Genealogy of Jesus in the New Testament 

The New Testament provides two accounts of the genealogy of Jesus, one in the Gospel of Matthew and another in the Gospel of Luke. Matthew starts with Abraham, while Luke begins with Adam. The lists are identical between Abraham and David but differ radically from that point. Matthew has twenty-seven generations from David to Joseph, whereas Luke has forty-two, with almost no overlap between the names on the two lists.⁠ Notably, the two accounts also disagree on who Joseph's father was: Matthew says he was Jacob, while Luke says he was Heli.

Traditional Christian scholars (starting with the historian Eusebius) have put forward various theories that seek to explain why the lineages are so different, such as that Matthew's account follows the lineage of Joseph, while Luke's follows his legal lineage through his biological uncle via Levirate marriage ("Matthan, whose descent is traced to Solomon, begot Jacob, Matthan dying, Matthat, whose lineage is from Nathan, by marrying the widow of the former, had Heli. Hence, Heli and Jacob were brothers by the same mother.") Some modern critical scholars like Marcus Borg and John Dominic Crossan claim both genealogies as inventions, to bring the Messianic claims into conformity with Jewish criteria.
However, it is not unusual, since ancient genealogies often skip generations that are not of particular interest to the topic at hand.

See also 
Jewish genealogy
Kings of Israel and Judah

References

External links 

 FactGrid:The Bible & Quran Project, Wikibase data for all Persons mentioned in the Bible with their respective genealogical ties and references. FactGrid, a database for historians